Gao is an East Asian surname of Chinese origin that can be literally translated as "high" or "tall". There are approximately 17 million living people with this surname. Some places, such as Taiwan, usually romanise this family name into "Kao". In Hong Kong, it is romanized to "Ko". In Macau, it is romanized to "Kou". In English, it is romanized to "Kauh". In 2019 it was the 19th most common surname in Mainland China. The Korean surname, "Ko" or "Koh", is derived from and written with the same Chinese character (高).

Romanisation and pronunciation

Origin 
According to Lüshi Chunqiu, the earliest figure with the Gao surname was Gao Yuan (高元) who created dwellings in antiquity. Zhuanxu, the grandson of the Yellow Emperor, was also known as Gao Yang (高陽).

Another origin of Gao is the Jiang (姜) surname.  According to the Song dynasty encyclopedia Tongzhi, an early ancestor was Gao Xi (高傒) who was granted the surname Gao in honour of his grandfather Prince Gao (公子高). Prince Gao was the son of Duke Wen of the state of Qi whose ancestral name was Jiang (姜).

Many non-Han Chinese used the surname Gao:
 The Xianbei clan of Lou (楼) of the Northern Wei period later changed their surname to Gao. The Yuan (元) family also adopted this surname in this period
Xú (徐) family of the Northern Qi period 
Baipu (百濮) people of Yunnan (雲南)
According to Samguk Sagi, the king of Goguryeo regarded himself as a descendant of Chinese heroes because he called his surname "Go" (Hanja: 高) as he was the descendant of Gao Yang (Hanja: 高陽) who was a grandchild of the Yellow Emperor and Gaoxin (Hanja: 高辛) who was a great-grandchild of Yellow Emperor. However, this is discredited as a mythology by Kim Busik, who mentioned that the surname Ko in Korea is from Buyeo origin.

Notable people

Historical 
 Gao Yang Founding Emperor of Northern Qi
Gao Yin Second emperor of Northern Qi
Gao Yan Third emperor of Northern Qi
Gao Zhan Fourth emperor of Northern Qi
Gao Wei  Fifth emperor of Northern Qi
Gao Heng  Sixth emperor of Northern Qi
Gao Yun (Northern Yan), Founding emperor of the Northern Yan Dynasty
Gao Cheng paramount official of the Chinese/Xianbei state Eastern Wei
Gao Anagong official of the Northern Qi
 Gao Huan paramount general of the Chinese/Xianbei dynasty Northern Wei and Northern Wei's branch successor state Eastern Wei. 
 Gao Shaoyi  imperial prince of the Chinese dynasty Northern Qi
 Gao Yanzong imperial prince of the Chinese dynasty Northern Qi
 Gao Shilian, chancellor during the Tang Dynasty
 Gao Shun, Military General under Warlord Lü Bu during the late Han Dynasty
 Gao Jiong, official during the Sui Dynasty
 Gao Yun (Northern Wei), official during the Northern Wei Dynasty
 Gao Xianzhi, general during the Tang Dynasty of Korean descent
 Gao Qiong, general during the Northern Song Dynasty
 Gao, guitarist

Modern 
 Alice Longyu Gao, Chinese musician
 Gao Chengyong (1964–2019), Chinese serial killer
 Gao Dena, Donald Knuth, American computer scientist
 Gao Gang, a Chinese Communist leader
 Gao Hanyu (also known as Kido, born 1989), Chinese actor and singer
 Gao Hong, pipa player and composer
 Gao Jianli, a Zhu player and friend of Jing Ke
 Gao Jixing, a king of Jingnan
 Gao Jun, Chinese-American table tennis player
 Gao Lei (born 1992), Chinese Olympic individual trampoline gymnast
 Gao Lin, Chinese professional footballer
 Gao Ling, Chinese badminton player
 Gao Min (cyclist), Chinese cyclist
 Gao Min (diver), Chinese diver
 Gao Qiu, character from Shui Hu Zhuan
 Gao Shuying, Chinese pole vaulter
 Gao Song, Chinese figure skater
 Gao Weiguang (born 1983), Chinese actor and model
 Gao Xie, calligraphist, painter, poet, writer, book collector
 Gao Xingjian, 2000 Nobel Prize in Literature
 Gao Xiumin (actress) (1959–2005), Chinese comedy actress
 Gao Xiumin (handballer) (born 1963), former female Chinese handball player
 Gao Xu, poet, writer, publisher, revolutionary
 Gao Yang (shot putter) (born 1993), Chinese shot putter
 Gao Yihan, intellectual
 Gao Yisheng, creator of the Gao style of the Chinese Internal Martial Art of Baguazhang
 Gao Youxin (1916-1948), ace-fighter pilot of the Chinese Air Force during the War of Resistance/World War II
 Gao Yuanyuan (born 1979), Chinese actress and model
 Gao Zhihang (1906-1937), ace-fighter pilot of the Chinese Air Force during the War of Resistance/World War II
 Gao Zhisheng, activist
 Gao Zhunyi (born 1995), Chinese footballer of Korean descent
 Gao Jianing, also known as J.G. Ex-member of South Korean boy group, Cross Gene, a contestant of Produce Camp 2019
Judy Gao (born 1994), New Zealand fashion designer and chess player
Curley Gao, also known as Xilinnayi Gao. Singer-songwriter, center of BonBon Girls 303, a debuted girl group of Produce Camp 2020
Gao Qingchen,  also known as Nine. Thai actor and singer of Chinese descent, member of the multi-national Chinese group INTO1, a debuted boy group of Produce Camp 2021

Kao 
 Charles K. Kao (1933–2018), inventor of data transmission using optical fibre, was awarded half of the 2009 Nobel Prize in Physics
 Jack Kao, Taiwanese actor
 Kao Ming-huey, International Commissioner of the Boy Scouts of China
 Kao Yang-sheng, former Political Deputy Minister of Council of Indigenous Peoples of the Republic of China
 Min Kao
 Nicholas Kao Se Tseien (1897–2007), Catholic priest, supercentenarian
 Ping-Tse Kao (1888–1970), Taiwanese astronomer

Kō 
 Kō no Moronao
 Kō no Moroyasu
 Kō no Morofuyu

Cao 
 Joseph Cao

References

External links 
胶州高姓来源及分布

Chinese-language surnames
Individual Chinese surnames